Monika Engeseth, also known as Moyka, is a Norwegian singer and songwriter from Hallingdal, Norway. She has called herself a "Norwegian Pop Witch".

She started releasing songs under the European record label Made Records in 2019. In 2021, she signed with the Stockholm and Los Angeles based record label SNAFU Records.

Early life 

Engeseth grew up in a city located in Hallingdal Valley (eastern Norway) and always wanted to create music since a very young age.

After starting to create music, she released her first songs through an EP named "Circles" after some months of work in 2019.

Career 
Her first EP named Circles included 5 songs and was released on October 18, 2019.

She started to become more recognized after performances on Norwegian national media, including NRK P3 radio and TV2 channel through "God Morgen Norge". She also performs at concerts across Norway and has sung at international music festivals.

She sang in January 2020 for the 34th edition of Eurosonic (Netherlands). In April 2020, during the COVID-19 crisis, she performed in the Verftet Online Music Festival, a Norwegian music festival gathering several artists that was fully virtual to avoid risk of contagion.

In May, she was accepted to participate in The Great Escape Festival (2020 edition) in Brighton, but it was canceled due to the COVID-19 pandemic.

Her second EP called Spaces was released on June 12, 2020 and included four new songs.

Her pop music has its own style but is influenced by other Norwegian singers such as AURORA or Sigrid, or bands like Highasakite or Röyksopp. She declares that developing her own "mystic universe", as do other artists like Lorde or Lykke Li according to her words, is something she always focuses on.

In 2021 she signed with record label SNAFU Records. In March 2021, Moyka released the double-sided single Stay and As Long As You're Here ("ALAYAH") as the first songs of her upcoming debut album.

Her third work and debut album "The Revelations of Love" was released on October 22, 2021. The singer describes this album as a concept album turned about the different feelings of love; including both personal and fictional story songs. A physical version is made available in November 2022.

Moyka is expected to work on upcoming Disney+ Halloween movie Hocus Pocus 2's soundtrack.

In January 2023, she announces being selected to participate to the inter-European Keychange musical event, co-founded by the EU's Creative Europe program and aimed to promote European artists thanks to showcases and conferences taking place around the world.

Discography

Circles - Oct. 2019

Circles (Acoustic) - Nov. 2019

Spaces - June 2020

The Revelations of Love - Oct. 2021

Uncategorized (extra songs)

References

External links 
 Eq Music Blog : Moyka
 Moyka Interview for Ja Ja Ja
 Ballade : About norwegian singer Moyka (norsk)

1997 births
Living people
Norwegian singer-songwriters
Norwegian songwriters
Norwegian artists
Musicians from Bergen
Synth-pop singers
Women singer-songwriters
English-language singers from Norway
Women in electronic music
21st-century Norwegian women singers
Norwegian pop singers
Women pop singers